Brundtland's Third Cabinet was a minority, Labour Government of Norway.  It succeeded the H-Sp-KrF Cabinet Syse, and sat between 3 November 1990 and 25 October 1996. It was replaced by the Labour Cabinet Jagland.  The cabinet was active during two parliaments, both 1989–93 and 1993–97. Brundtlands third cabinet had the following composition.

Cabinet members

|}

See also 
 First cabinet Brundtland
 Second cabinet Brundtland
 Norwegian Council of State
 Government of Norway
 List of Norwegian governments

Notes

References 

Brundtland 3
Brundtland 3
1990 establishments in Norway
1996 disestablishments in Norway
Cabinets established in 1990
Cabinets disestablished in 1996